Eduardo José Herrera Alvarado (born 6 June 1993) is a Venezuelan professional footballer who plays as a goalkeeper for Venezuelan Segunda División club Titanes.

References

External links

1993 births
Living people
Caracas FC players
Carabobo F.C. players
Atlético El Vigía players
Asociación Civil Deportivo Lara players
Venezuelan Primera División players
Venezuelan Segunda División players
Venezuelan footballers
Association football goalkeepers
Academia Puerto Cabello players